Broadway Lady is a 1925 American silent drama film directed by Wesley Ruggles and starring Evelyn Brent.

Plot
As described in a review in a film magazine, Evelyn, as a chorus girl, is admired by a young blue-blood whose family invite her to a reception to show her up. To teach them a lesson for their snobbery, she marries this chap. Bob. His sister becomes infatuated with Martyn, a libertine, and to save her when she prepares to elope, Evelyn goes to Martyn's apartment. He is shot and Evelyn captured and accused. It develops that Mary, a girl Evelyn has befriended, had a row with Martyn and the shot was accidental. Both young women are freed and Bob's family is glad to receive Evelyn as a member of the household.

Cast

Preservation
A print of Broadway Lady is located in the archive of the Library of Congress.

References

External links

1925 films
1925 drama films
Silent American drama films
American silent feature films
American black-and-white films
Films directed by Wesley Ruggles
Film Booking Offices of America films
1920s American films